Manuel Maria Mustelier (1878–1941) was a Cuban writer whose works were included in the newspaper El Mundo, as well as El Fígaro, Bohemia, and Cuba y América. Born in Santiago de Cuba, he engaged in separatist activities from an early age alongside his brother, Luis Alejandro. He also taught at various schools in Havana.

References

Cuban male writers
People from Santiago de Cuba
1878 births
1941 deaths